Francisco Suárez Dávila (born 20 April 1943) is a Mexican diplomat and politician affiliated with the Institutional Revolutionary Party. He is the former Ambassador of Mexico to Canada from 2013 to 2016. As of 2014 he served as Deputy of the LIX Legislature of the Mexican Congress as a plurinominal representative.

Education
He studied in National Autonomous University of Mexico from 1961 to 1965 and graduated with a degree in Law. In 1967, he obtained a master's degree in economics from King's College.

References

1943 births
Living people
Politicians from Mexico City
National Autonomous University of Mexico alumni
Ambassadors of Mexico to Canada
Members of the Chamber of Deputies (Mexico)
Institutional Revolutionary Party politicians